GURPS Prime Directive is a sourcebook for GURPS, first published in 2002. It is named after the Prime Directive in Star Trek, the universe it adapts. It spawned several associated sourcebooks.

Contents
GURPS Prime Directive allows players to play any type character, also allows cross-genre moves to be made, and includes limited elements of the Traveller Universe.

Publication history
After the folding of Task Force Games and the cancellation of the original Prime Directive line, Amarillo Design Bureau, Inc., the new publishers of Star Fleet Universe games, were left with the question of what to do with PD. They were primarily a wargame company, and the poor sales of the supplements were cause for a reexamination. Eventually, they approached Steve Jackson Games to use the Powered by GURPS format.

GURPS Prime Directive, as a part of the "Powered by GURPS" book line, was published in 2002 under license by Amarillo Design Bureau to depict the world of Star Fleet Battles. Task Force Games produced GURPS Prime Directive for third-edition GURPS (2000) and GURPS Prime Directive for fourth-edition GURPS (2004). Amarillo Design Bureau continued publication of Prime Directive books for the GURPS, d20, and d20 Modern game systems.

Originally GURPS Prime Directive, the GURPS Klingons imperial source book and GURPS Module Prime Alpha module were released under the third edition of GURPS. The new fourth edition of GURPS prompted a rework of the previous major books (GPD and GK) and a delay of the (then) upcoming Romulans sourcebook (which became one of the first 4th Edition GURPS supplements). Module Prime Alpha (and its intended sequel, Module Prime Beta) were dropped from the line, due to poor sales.

The following GURPS 4th Edition books were released aside from the core rulebook, GURPS Klingons, GURPS Romulans, and GURPS Federation have been released for this new system.

Books
Additional books produced as a subseries of PD include:
GURPS Federation
GURPS Klingons
GURPS Romulans
Dread Pirate Aldo
Planet Aldo
Starship Aldo

Reception

Reviews
 GURPS Prime Directive was reviewed in White Wolf #48.
 Reviewed in Valkyrie #1.
Pyramid

References

GURPS 3rd edition
GURPS 4th edition
Prime Directive
Role-playing games based on Star Trek
Role-playing game supplements introduced in 2002
Science fiction role-playing games
Space opera role-playing games
Star Fleet Universe